The Broken Wheel is a 1996 young adult science fiction novel by Kerry Greenwood.

Background
The Broken Wheel was first published in Australia in 1996 by Moonstone in paperback format. It won in a tie situation with Hillary Bell's Mirror, Mirror the 1996 Aurealis Award for best young-adult novel.

Plot summary
After an apocalyptic event, the survivors have formed into groups. These include the Travellers, who trade in small goods; the medievalists in the enclave Thorngard; the Tribe, a loose gathering of nomads; and in the city the Breakers, who destroy every machine they find, blaming the machines for the disaster. Sarah, a child of the Breakers, joins with the Travellers in an attempt to save the world from destruction.

References

1996 Australian novels
1996 science fiction novels
Children's science fiction novels
Australian science fiction novels
Australian young adult novels
Aurealis Award-winning works
HarperCollins books
Australian post-apocalyptic novels